Asarum monodoriflorum, also known by the common name Monodora-kan-aoi, is a low-growing, herbaceous perennial plant. It is critically endangered.

Distribution 
It is native to the Ryukyu Islands of Japan.

Taxonomy 
It was described by Sumihiko Hatusima, and Eiji Yamahata, and published in J. Phytogeogr. Taxon. 37: 72 in 1989.

References 

Flora of Japan
Plants described in 1989
monodoriflorum